There are forty-four colleges and universities in the U.S. state of West Virginia that are listed under the Carnegie Classification of Institutions of Higher Education. These institutions include two research universities, five master's universities, and fourteen baccalaureate colleges, as well as twenty-one associate's colleges. In addition, there are three institutions classified as special-focus institutions.

West Virginia's oldest surviving post-secondary institution is Bethany College, founded on March 2, 1840 by Alexander Campbell. Marshall University and West Liberty University were both established in 1837, but as private subscription schools. Founded in 1867, West Virginia University is the state's largest public institution of higher learning in terms of enrollment, as it had 29,707 students as of spring 2013. Eastern West Virginia Community and Technical College is the state's smallest, with an enrollment of 822. With an enrollment of 1,549 students, Wheeling University is West Virginia's largest traditional private post-secondary institution, while Valley College–Princeton is the state's smallest, with an enrollment of 72. The American Public University System, a private for-profit, distance education institution based in Charles Town, has the largest enrollment of any post-secondary institution in West Virginia, with 31,331 students. Catholic Distance University, a fully online non-profit university in Charles Town, educates undergraduate students in Liberal Arts and theology and graduate students in theology and educational ministry.

West Virginia has two land-grant universities: West Virginia State University and West Virginia University. West Virginia University is also the state's sole participant university in the National Space Grant College and Fellowship Program. In addition, West Virginia has two historically black colleges and universities that are members of the Thurgood Marshall College Fund: Bluefield State University and West Virginia State University.

West Virginia has three medical schools: Marshall University Joan C. Edwards School of Medicine, West Virginia School of Osteopathic Medicine, and West Virginia University School of Medicine. It has one law school, West Virginia University College of Law, which is accredited by the American Bar Association. The majority (thirty-three) of West Virginia's post-secondary institutions are accredited by the Higher Learning Commission (HLC). Most are accredited by multiple agencies, such as the Accreditation Commission for Education in Nursing (ACEN), the American Physical Therapy Association (APTA), the Commission on Collegiate Nursing Education (CCNE), and the National Council for Accreditation of Teacher Education (NCATE).

Institutions

Defunct institutions

See also
 Higher education in the United States
 List of college athletic programs in West Virginia
 List of recognized higher education accreditation organizations
 Lists of American institutions of higher education

References
Explanatory notes

Citations

Bibliography

External links
 United States Department of Education listing of accredited institutions in West Virginia

Lists of universities and colleges by U.S. state
Universities and colleges